Unilever Leeds, in the north-east of Leeds off the A6120 Leeds Outer Ring Road, is a large cosmetics factory and research site of the Anglo-Dutch company Unilever that makes all of its deodorant products for the UK. It is the largest deodorants factory in Europe. The factory supplies the whole of Europe.

History
Unilever is the UK's and the world's largest manufacturer of deodorants. Around 180m Unilever deodorants are sold in the UK each year. Unilever has three times the market share of its closest competitors. In the mid-1990s, the UK was producing 10% of the world's, and 25% of Europe's, aerosol products.

Structure
The site is situated north of the roundabout of the A64 and A6120. Due to the flammable substances (LPG and ethanol) stored on site to create the propellants, the site is regulated by the Control of Major Accident Hazards Regulations 2015. The cosmetics industry across Europe is regulated by Cosmetics Europe.

Research
The site employs around 50 people to test its products on; people are subjected to temperatures up to 56C. One of the main substances in aerosol anti-perspirants is aluminium chlorohydrate. There are around 150 scientists on the site.

The site has worked with DCA Design International Ltd of Warwick, for design of its aerosol cans

Products
It makes compressed aerosols. It produces close to a billion deodorants a year. It can produce around 3,665 aerosols per minute across 12 packing lines. The site also has 3 roll-on packing lines with a total output of 750 bottles per minute between them.

See also
 Economy of Leeds
 Journal of Applied Toxicology
 Procter & Gamble on Tyneside, its main competitor
 The British Aerosol Manufacturers' Association (BAMA)
 Unilever Research & Development Port Sunlight Laboratory on the Wirral

References

External links
 Lynx
 Every Can Counts

Aerosol sprays
Buildings and structures in Leeds
Chemical plants of the United Kingdom
Economy of Leeds
Research institutes in West Yorkshire
Leeds